William McKinney or Bill McKinney or Billy McKinney may refer to: 

 William McKinney (1895–1969), American jazz drummer
 William "Bill" McKinney, president of the Pacific School of Religion
 Bill McKinney (1931–2011), American character actor
 Bill McKinney (American football) (born 1945), NFL player
 Bill McKinney (footballer) (born 1936), English former footballer
 Billy McKinney (basketball) (born 1955), American former basketball player and broadcaster
 Billy McKinney (baseball) (born 1994), Major League Baseball player
 Billy McKinney (politician) (1927–2010), American former politician in Georgia